Hikō-ki Gumo (ひこうき雲, Vapour Trail), stylized as HIKŌ-KI GUMO, is the debut studio album by Japanese singer-songwriter Yumi Arai, released in November 1973. The album is most known for its title (and lead-off) track.

Overview
Before the album was released, the debut single "Henji wa Iranai" (which sold for only 300 copies) along with her second single "Kitto Ieru" (B-side: "Hikō-ki Gumo") was released first. Both of the singles were included in this album.

"Hikō-ki Gumo" is a song originally made by Arai for Izumi Yukimura, the recording of the song was done but it was never released due to various reasons. It was instead Arai, who was 19 at the time, who first sang the song. 

When Arai was in elementary school, she had a classmate who had a serious illness (muscular dystrophy). The boy would later die during his first year of high school. "Hikō-ki Gumo" is a song in which she mourns her friend who died at a young age and compares his life to a vapour trail. It is said that this was the inspiration for making this song.

Caramel Mama performed the backing band for the album. Its members included Masataka Matsutoya, who would later be her husband, as keyboardist; Haruomi Hosono on bass, Shigeru Suzuki on guitar and Tatsuo Hayashi on drums. Arai's voice was quivering all the time during the studio recordings, as a result, it took more than a year to complete the album.

The design for the album jacket was influenced by church music, and was designed to imitate the German classic label, Archiv Produktion. The illustration in the booklet is by Arai herself and contains the poem "Birthday" (誕生日), which describes the change from a girl to an adult. Along with it are the lyrics for the songs.

In 2013, it was announced that the song will be used as the theme song for the Ghibli movie "The Wind Rises". At the same time, the album would get a reissue. The reissue's jacket features a Mitsubishi Zero, drawn by the studio, along with a white background. The booklet features all of the songs lyrics, together with the main visuals of the movie.

Release history

Hikō-ki Gumo was released on November 20, 1973, by Toshiba-EMI/Express (now part of EMI Music Japan). The album was also distributed by Alfa Records for a period of time, as Alfa also held ancillary rights to this and the other LPs Arai released during the time Alfa was still a publishing company; those rights later reverted to EMI Japan in 1994-thereabouts, when EMI regained distribution of Alfa's catalogue except for the artists who were published by Alfa and were distributed by other labels (and later retained most of it, including Arai's first 4 LPs [whose rights she had managed to buy before Alfa was sold to Sony], while the rest, the catalogue from when Alfa was a recording label and the bulk of the catalogue from when it was a publishing company, went with Sony Music Entertainment, including session player Haruomi Hosono's future work both as a solo musician and as part of Yellow Magic Orchestra). On April 26, 2000, the recording was digitally remastered for re-release on CD by Bernie Grundman. Internet sales of the album began March 10, 2005.

Tracklisting
Lyrics & Composition: Yumi Arai
Arrangements: Yumi Arai, Caramel Mama

Personnel
Piano – Yumi Arai
Bass – Haruomi Hosono
Keyboard – Masataka Matsutoya
Guitar – Shigeru Suzuki
Drum – Tatsuo Hayashi
Nylon Strings Guitar – Haruomi Hosono (A-1, A-5)
Percussion – Masataka Matsutoya (A-3), Shigeru Suzuki (A-3), Tatsuo Hayashi (A-3, A-5, B-4), Rei Ohara (B-4)
Banjo – Masataka Matsutoya (B-5)
Flute – Akira Miyazawa (A-2)
Chorus – Masataka Matsutoya (A-2), Singers Three (A-3), Yumi Arai (B-4)
Tenor sax – Konosuke Saijo (A-5)
Steel Guitar – Hiroki Komazawa (B-2, B-5)

Chart Positions

Weekly charts

Year-end charts

References

1973 debut albums
Yumi Matsutoya albums
EMI Music Japan albums
Alfa Records albums